Inchkha is a rural locality (a selo) in Kazbekovsky District, Republic of Dagestan, Russia. The population was 2,077 in 2010. There are 18 streets.

Geography
Khubar and Miatli are the nearest rural localities.

Nationalities 
Avars live there.

References 

Rural localities in Kazbekovsky District